Fort Chipewyan/Small Lake Water Aerodrome  was located  northeast of Fort Chipewyan, Alberta, Canada. The airport was listed as abandoned in the 15 March 2007 Canada Flight Supplement.

See also
Fort Chipewyan Airport

References

Defunct seaplane bases in Alberta
Transport in the Regional Municipality of Wood Buffalo